Megachile paupera is a species of bee in the family Megachilidae. It was described by Pasteels in 1965.

References

Paupera
Insects described in 1965